Te-Ping Chen is an American journalist and author, currently residing in Philadelphia. From 2014 to 2018, she was a Beijing-based China correspondent for the Wall Street Journal.

Her great-grandfather was a poet and journalist from Guangxi.

Her debut story collection Land of Big Numbers was included in Barack Obama's 2021 summer reading list.

Books
Land of Big Numbers (2021)

References

External links
TE-PING CHEN

 

American women journalists
American journalists
Living people
Year of birth missing (living people)
21st-century American women